PGF/TikZ is a pair of languages for producing vector graphics (e.g., technical illustrations and drawings) from a geometric/algebraic description, with standard features including the drawing of points, lines, arrows, paths, circles, ellipses and polygons. PGF is a lower-level language, while TikZ is a set of higher-level macros that use PGF. The top-level PGF and TikZ commands are invoked as TeX macros, but in contrast with PSTricks, the PGF/TikZ graphics themselves are described in a language that resembles MetaPost. Till Tantau is the designer of the PGF and TikZ languages. He is also the main developer of the only known interpreter for PGF and TikZ, which is written in TeX. PGF is an acronym for "Portable Graphics Format". TikZ was introduced in version 0.95 of PGF, and it is a recursive acronym for "TikZ ist kein Zeichenprogramm" (German for "TikZ is not a drawing program").

Overview
The PGF/TikZ interpreter can be used from the popular LaTeX and ConTeXt macro packages, and also directly from the original TeX. Since TeX itself is not concerned with graphics, the interpreter supports multiple TeX output backends: dvips, dvipdfm/dvipdfmx/xdvipdfmx, TeX4ht, and pdftex's internal PDF output driver. Unlike PSTricks, PGF can thus directly produce either PostScript or PDF output, but it cannot use some of the more advanced PostScript programming features that PSTricks can use due to the "least common denominator" effect. PGF/TikZ comes with an extensive documentation; the version 3.1.4a of the manual has over 1300 pages.

The standard LaTeX picture environment can also be used as a front end for PGF — by merely using the pgfpict2e package.

The project has been under constant development since 2005. Most of the development is done by Till Tantau. Version 3.0.0 was released on 20 December 2013. One of the major new features of this version was graph drawing using the graphdrawing package, which however requires LuaTeX. This version also added a new data visualization method and support for direct SVG output via the new dvisvgm driver.

Export
Several graphical editors can produce output for PGF/TikZ, such as the KDE program Cirkuit and the math drawing program GeoGebra. Export to TikZ is also available as extensions for Inkscape, Blender, MATLAB, matplotlib, Gnuplot, and R. The circuit-macros package of m4 macros exports circuit diagrams to TikZ using the dpic -g command line option. The dot2tex program can convert files in the DOT graph description language to PGF/TikZ.

Libraries
TikZ features libraries for easy drawing of many kinds of diagrams, such as the following (alphabetized by library name):

 3D drawing3d
 Finite automata and Turing machinesautomata
 Coordinate system calculationscalc
 Calendarscalendar
 Chains: nodes typically connected by edges and arranged in rows and columnschain
 Logic circuit and electrical circuit diagramscircuits.logic and circuits.ee
 Entity–relationship diagramser
 Polygon folding diagramsfolding
 Graph drawing with automatic layout optionsgraphdrawing
 L-system drawingslindenmayersystems
 Sequences of basic math operationsmath
 Matricesmatrix
 Mind mapsmindmap
 Three-point perspective drawingsperspective
 Petri netspetri
 RDF semantic annotations (only in SVG output)rdf
 Special shapes and symbolsshapes.geometric and shapes.symbols
 Magnification of part of a graphic in an insetspy
 Paths in SVG syntaxsvg.path
 Treestrees
 Turtle graphicsturtle
 Zooming and panning graphicsviews

Gallery
The following images were created with TikZ and show some examples of the range of graphic types that can be produced. The link in each caption points to the source code for the image.

See also

 Asymptote (vector graphics language)

References

Further reading

  Conference talk video (version archived by archive.org; the previous site is unavailable) based on an earlier version of that paper.
  Comparison of several graphics systems in LaTeX.
  According to a 2011 review of the book in TUGboat: "It contains a detailed introduction to the TikZ suite—probably one of the best existing descriptions of this highly useful package."

External links

 PGF/TikZ on CTAN
 PGF/TikZ manual on CTAN
 PGF/TikZ gallery at TeXample.net

Cross-platform free software
Free TeX software
Graph description languages
Graph drawing software
Object-oriented programming languages
TeX SourceForge projects
Vector graphics markup languages